My Weekly Reader is the sixth studio album by American singer-songwriter Nellie McKay, consisting of covers of hits from the 1960s. The album entered the Billboard Heatseekers Albums chart, and garnered positive reviews upon its release.

Background and release 
"My Weekly Reader is Nellie McKay's sixth album, and second cover album, following her Doris Day tribute album "Normal as Blueberry Pie." The record consists entirely of covers of hits from the 1960s, including songs by Frank Zappa, Gerry and the Pacemakers, and Moby Grape. McKay enlisted Dweezil Zappa, Frank Zappa's son, to play guitar on her cover of his father's "Hungry Freaks, Daddy;" she also enlisted Bela Fleck to play banjo. Geoff Emerick, who had produced McKay's debut album, "Get Away From Me," was enlisted to co-produce the album with McKay, as well. The album was released physically and digitally on March 24, 2015. To promote the album, McKay performed at 54 Below in New York City.

Critical reception 

My Weekly Reader was met with mostly positive reviews from critics. On review aggregation website Metacritic, the album holds a score of 68, indicating "generally favorable reviews." In a positive review, PopMatters' Steve Horowitz awarded the album 8 stars (out of a possible 10), commenting that the album "kicks serious butt," and praising McKay's minimal changes to most of the compositions. Horowitz also praised the album's nostalgia, commenting that "McKay understands the complexity of the past and reveals her empathy for a more hopeful time when love and peace were fresh thoughts rather than a debased slogan." Rolling Stone'''s review, written by Will Hermes, was similarly positive, calling McKay a "renegade songwriter with an ultraflexible Great American Songbook sensibility," also feeling that "her musical smarts add the context." National Public Radio's review, penned by Ken Tucker, was positive towards the album as well, commenting that "there's a pleasing tension between the content of the lyric and the lovely purity of her vocals," and praising her modernization of some of the material.

Some critics had more mixed feelings regarding the album. Stephen Thomas Erlewine, writing for AllMusic, felt that while McKay sometimes "achieves a delicate balance between '60s reverence and a sly modern wink, a blurring of eras that plays to her strengths," she had ultimately made "odd" song selections that he felt were poorly-modernized; Erlwine awarded the album 3 stars. The Boston Globes Marc Hirsch was also critical of the album, calling the production "flat and dull" and expressing mixed feelings over McKay's minimal changes to the songs.

 Track listing 

 Personnel 
Adapted from AllMusic.Musicians Béla Fleck — banjo
 Bob Glaub — electric bass
 Nellie McKay — bells, clarinet, congas, cymbals, harmonica, keyboards, maracas, marimbas, organ, piano, tambourine, ukelele, all vocals
 Cary Park — banjo, 12-string guitar, acoustic guitar, electric guitar, steel guitar
 David Raven — drums
 Dweezil Zappa — guitar (on "Hungry Freaks, Daddy")Production Craig Parker Adams — assistant engineer
 Greg Calbi — mastering
 Geoff Emerick — engineering, mixing, production
 Spencer Guerra — mixing
 Nellie McKay — productionDesign'''
 David Alan Kogut — art direction, photography

Charts

References 

Nellie McKay albums
2015 albums
429 Records albums
Covers albums
Albums produced by Geoff Emerick